Sex, Drogen Und Industrial is an EP by the aggrotech band Combichrist. It spent seven weeks at number one in the Deutsche Alternative Charts.

Track listing

External links
http://www.combichrist.com/ - Combichrist official website

Combichrist albums
2004 EPs